Hollow (Vietnamese: Đoạt Hồn) is a 2014 Vietnamese horror film directed by Ham Tran.

Plot

Cast
 Trần Bảo Sơn as Vương Gia Huy
 Nguyễn Ngọc Hiệp as Diệp
 Nguyễn Hồng Ân as Chi
 Thanh Mỹ as Ái
 Jayvee Mai as Thức
 Kieu Chinh as Linh
 Minh Trang as Quyên
 Thương Tín as Thảo
 Nhung Kate as Tuyết
 Suboi as Hương
 Huy Ma as Vinh
 Thành Trung as Kiên

Release
Hollow was released on July 18, 2014 in Vietnam. It earned 160,000 admissions in its first four days in Vietnam from 1,140 screenings nationwide. It was first place in the Vietnamese box office over its first weekend over the American films A Million Ways to Die in the West, Planes: Fire & Rescue and Dawn of the Planet of the Apes.

Reception
Film Business Asia gave the film a seven out of ten rating, referring to the film as a "thoroughly generic but effective tale of demonic possession from Vietnam".

References

External links

Hollow at Allmovie
Trailer.

2014 films
Vietnamese-language films
2014 horror films
Films directed by Ham Tran
Vietnamese horror thriller films
2014 horror thriller films
Films set in Vietnam
Films shot in Vietnam